Longhua is an interchange station between Line 11 and Line 12 of the Shanghai Metro. It opened on 31 August 2013 as a station for Line 11. On 19 December 2015, the section of Line 12 including this station opened.

Station Layout

References

Railway stations in Shanghai
Line 11, Shanghai Metro
Line 12, Shanghai Metro
Shanghai Metro stations in Xuhui District
Railway stations in China opened in 2013